John Turner (1929–2020) was the 17th Prime Minister of Canada.

John Turner may also refer to:

Arts and entertainment
John Turner (1737–1787), English potter of the Turner family
John Doman Turner (1873–1938), British painter and member of the Camden Town Group
John Turner (lyricist) (born 1932), English lyricist
John Turner (actor) (born 1932), British actor
John Hastings Turner, English novelist, dramatist and theatre director
"Uncle" John Turner (1933–2007), American drummer of Johnny Winter Band
John Nathan-Turner né John Turner (1947–2002), British television producer
John Turner, Canadian comedic actor associated with the clown duo Mump and Smoot

Politicians
Sir John Turner, 3rd Baronet, British Member of Parliament for King's Lynn in 1739–1768
John W. Turner (1800–1883), American territorial politician
John Sargent Turner (1826–1900), Queensland politician
John Herbert Turner (1834–1923), Canadian politician
John Mouat Turner (1900–1945), Canadian politician
John Melville Turner (1922–2013), Canadian politician
John F. Turner (born 1942), American environment politician
John Garth Turner (born 1949), Canadian journalist, broadcaster, and politician
John Turner (Australian politician) (born 1949)
John Turner (Illinois politician) (born 1956), American politician and judge
John Turner (Texas politician) (born 1974), Texas state representative
John Turner (Massachusetts politician), delegate to the first Massachusetts Provincial Congress

Sportspeople
John Turner (cricketer, born 1816) (1816–1892), Cambridge University cricketer and clergyman
John Turner (cricketer, born 1854), English cricketer
John Turner (cricketer, born 1863) (1863–1924), Cambridge University cricketer and lawyer
John Turner (cricketer, born 1879) (1879–1963), Scottish cricketer and educator
John Turner (cricketer, born 2001)
John Turner (Minor Counties cricketer) (1949–2012), English cricketer
John Turner (Oxford University cricketer), English cricketer and clergyman
John Turner (1890s footballer), English football player for Manchester United
John Turner (footballer, born 1913), English footballer for Leeds United and Mansfield Town
John Turner (footballer, born 1954), English football goalkeeper
John Turner (American football) (born 1956), former National Football League player
John Turner (basketball) (born 1967), American former basketball player
John Turner (footballer, born 1986), English football forward

Other people
John Turner (Mayflower passenger) (c. 1590–1651)
John Turner (fl. 1668–1676), New England merchant for whom the House of the Seven Gables in Salem, Massachusetts was built
John Turner (archdeacon of Taunton) (died 1817), English Anglican priest, archdeacon of Taunton
John Turner (bishop) (died 1831), Anglican bishop
John William Turner (1790–1835), Scottish surgeon
John Turner (architect) (1806–1890), English architect
John Turner (fur trapper) (1807–1847), American fur trapper and investor in the Willamette Cattle Company
John Wesley Turner (1833–1899), U.S. Army officer and Union Army general
John Mosely Turner (1856–1968), British supercentenarian
John Turner (naval officer) (1864–1949), Australian naval officer
John Turner (anarchist) (1865–1934), Scottish anarchist and trade union leader
John Turner (archdeacon of Basingstoke) (1867–1952), English Anglican priest, archdeacon of Winchester
John Kenneth Turner (1879–1948), American publisher
John Stewart Turner (1908–1991), Australian botanist and plant physiologist
John Frayn Turner (1923–2015), British author specializing in military history
John F. C. Turner (born 1927), British architect and housing theorist
John D. Turner (1938–2019), American professor of religious studies
John Christopher Turner (born 1947), American citizen who fought the Soviets in Afghanistan and later saved people from a Taliban attack
John Turner (psychologist) (1947–2011), British social psychologist
John B. Turner, American attorney and judge
John Evan Turner, Welsh idealist philosopher and writer

Fictional
John Turner, a character in the 1891 Sherlock Holmes short story "The Boscombe Valley Mystery"

See also
Jack Turner (disambiguation)
Jon Turner (active 1974–1988), British yacht builder
Jonathan Turner (disambiguation)